Växjö Innebandyklubb (often referred to as Växjö Vipers or simply Vipers) is a Swedish floorball club. The club is currently playing in the highest Swedish floorball league, the Svenska Superligan. Their home arena is Fortnox Arena and the club was founded May 22, 1988.

References

External links
Växjö Vipers official web site

Swedish floorball teams